KuCoin is a global cryptocurrency exchange founded in Singapore with the company headquarters currently based in Seychelles. The exchange was established in 2013, however the company wasn't founded until 2017. In 2017, the company focused on the exchange to launch it officially. To date, KuCoin is the fourth-largest cryptocurrency exchange.

History
KuCoin was started in 2013 by two tech geeks, with Johnny Lyu being one of the co-founders, and is now the CEO.

In November 2018, the company received $20 million in venture capital funding from IDG Capital, Matrix Partners, and Neo Global Capital.

In June 2020, KuCoin along with other cryptocurrency exchanges had a class action lawsuit brought against them in the State of New York for allegedly selling digital assets without registering them with federal or state regulators. Two years later, the case was dismissed.

In September 2020, KuCoin was the victim of a cyberattack according to an inquiry from the United Nations saying $281 million worth of assets was stolen and linked to North Korean hackers. Later it was said that the exchange was able to recover 84% of the stolen cryptocurrency.

In November 2021, KuCoin launched a $100 million metaverse fund, which is intended to accelerate the maturation of the emerging blockchain category.

In May 2022, KuCoin raised $150 million in a pre-series B round led by Jump Crypto, with participation from Circle Ventures, IDG Capital, and Matrix Partners. The deal put the company's valuation at $10 billion.

In August 2022, as part of a large block of cryptocurrency exchanges including Poloniex and BTCC, KuCoin was blocked in South Korea for lacking registration to operate in the country.

In December 2022, KuCoin was criticized for their high yield “dual investment” product. This led to a letter from United States Senator Ron Wyden (D-Ore) sent to KuCoin and other major exchanges, requesting information on how they manage their products.

In February 2023, KuCoin along with another cryptocurrency exchange Huobi, were criticized for allowing traders using their platforms to transact using debit cards issued by sanctioned Russian banks.

In March 2023, the New York attorney general sued KuCoin for failing to register as a securities and commodities broker-dealer alleging the exchange is violating securities laws.

See also
 Cryptocurrency exchanges
 Cryptocurrency
 Blockchain

References

Companies of Seychelles
Digital currency exchanges
Bitcoin_companies
Cryptocurrencies